Notun Kuri is a Bangladeshi reality television competition series for child artistes created by Mustafa Monwar. The show debuted in 1966 which ran on Pakistan Television from 1966 to 1971. After the independence of Bangladesh, the competition was relaunched and ran on Bangladesh Television from 1976 to 2006. 
The name of the show comes from a poem named "Kishor (Teenager)" by Golam Mostofa.

Judges
 Anil Kishon Sinha

Talented Children raised from Notun Kuri
Winners of the show were child artists like Tarana Halim, Rumana Rashid Ishita, Tarin Ahmed, Meher Afroz Shaon, Firoz Mahmud, Sabrin Saka Meem and Nusrat Imroz Tisha.

 Tamalika Karmakar (dance)
 Mehbooba Mahnoor Chandni (dance)
 Samina Chowdhury (singing) 1977
 Azad Rahman Shakil (Master Shakil, film actor)
 Firoz Mahmud (Art/painting)
 Tareen Jahan (acting, dancing and storytelling divisions)
 Rumana Rashid Ishita (dance, song, Art, acting) 
 Tisha (actress) (Acting)
 Sabrin Saka Meem (Acting)

References

1966 Pakistani television series debuts
1971 Pakistani television series endings
1976 Bangladeshi television series debuts
2006 Bangladeshi television series endings
1970s Bangladeshi television series
1960s reality television series
1970s reality television series
1980s reality television series
1990s reality television series
2000s reality television series
Bengali-language television programming in Bangladesh
Bangladesh Television original programming